Tine Eerlingen (born 24 May 1976, in Ghent) is a Belgian politician and is affiliated to the New Flemish Alliance (N-VA). She was elected as a member of the Flemish Parliament in 2009.

Notes

Living people
Members of the Flemish Parliament
New Flemish Alliance politicians
1976 births
Politicians from Ghent
21st-century Belgian politicians
21st-century Belgian women politicians